Primitive Race is an international industrial supergroup created by Chris Kniker and featuring Raymond Watts (PIG, KMFDM), Dave Ogilvie (Skinny Puppy), Mark Gemini Thwaite (Peter Murphy, Spear of Destiny, Tricky, Mob Research, The Mission, Gary Numan), Erie Loch (LUXT, Blownload, Exageist), Chuck Mosley (Faith No More), Graham Crabb (Pop Will Eat Itself) and Kourtney Klein (Combichrist, Nitzer Ebb).

The project began as a social media campaign on Twitter and has since incorporated a successful crowd funding element on Indiegogo.  Followed by a pre-release sampler made available on September 13, 2013, via SoundCloud, announced on @tweakermusic, @primitiverace and as reported on metal underground

Primitive Race published an interview featuring Graham Crabb on YouTube on September 26, 2013, detailing how the band collaborates, produces and constructs their music.

On March 10, 2015, Primitive Race announced the release of their first E.P. "Long In The Tooth" through Metropolis Records on June 19, 2015. The self-titled debut album was released August 7, 2015.

Members
Chuck Mosley - Vocals, programming, mixing 
Chris Kniker – Bass, Vocals, Backing Vocals – Announced May 10, 2013 
Dave Ogilvie – Programming, Mixing – Announced May 17, 2013 
Mark Gemini Thwaite – Guitar, Programming, Bass – Announced May 31, 2013
Erie Loch - Programming, Guitar, Bass, Visuals – Announced June 2, 2013 
Graham Crabb – Vocals, Guitar, Bass, Programming – Announced June 14, 2013
Kourtney Klein - Vocals, programming, mixing - Announced November 8, 2013

Discography

Studio albums
 Primitive Race (2015)
 Soul Pretender (2017)
 Cranial Matter (2019)

EPs
 Long in the Tooth (2015) – With PIG

References

External links
 Primitive Race Website
 Primitive Race on Discogs

Metropolis Records artists
American industrial rock musical groups
Musical groups established in 2013
2013 establishments in California